Aleksandr Tillo (11 July 1870 – 8 January 1938) was a Russian sports shooter. He competed in five events at the 1912 Summer Olympics.

References

1870 births
1938 deaths
Russian male sport shooters
Olympic shooters of Russia
Shooters at the 1912 Summer Olympics
Sportspeople from Kyiv